Luke "Buster" Watson (born Graeme Lynton George Watson; 19 November 1957) is a male retired British sprinter.

Athletics career
Watson competed in the men's 200 metres at the 1984 Summer Olympics. He represented England at the 1978 Commonwealth Games in the Men's decathlon, and also competed for England in the Men's 200 metres at the 1982 Commonwealth Games in Brisbane, Queensland, Australia. Watson also represented Great Britain at the 1983 World Championships in Athletics.

At national level, he was also double sprint champion at the 1983 UK Athletics Championships, 100 metres runner-up in 1982, and 200 metres runner-up in 1984. At the AAA Championships he was 200 m in 1982, 1984 and 1985, as well as 100 m runner-up in 1978. He placed second in the 60 metres behind Ghana's Ernest Obeng at the AAA Indoor Championships in 1984.

International competitions

National titles
UK Athletics Championships
100 m: 1983
200 m: 1983

See also
Athletics at the 1978 Commonwealth Games – Men's decathlon
Athletics at the 1982 Commonwealth Games – Men's 200 metres
List of 200 metres national champions (men)

References

External links

1957 births
Living people
English male sprinters
British male sprinters
Olympic male sprinters
Olympic athletes of Great Britain
Athletes (track and field) at the 1984 Summer Olympics
Commonwealth Games competitors for England
Athletes (track and field) at the 1978 Commonwealth Games
Athletes (track and field) at the 1982 Commonwealth Games
World Athletics Championships athletes for Great Britain